Norman Edward "Ted" Toleman (born 14 March 1938 in South Africa) is the former principal and founder of the Toleman Formula One team.

References

1938 births
Living people
British motorsport people
Formula One team owners
Formula One team principals
South African motorsport people
South African emigrants to the United Kingdom